Leonardo di Mello Martins Tomé, known as Leo Tomé (born 17 September 1986) is a Brazilian football player who plays for Farense. He also holds Portuguese citizenship.

Club career
He made his professional debut in the Segunda Liga for Mafra on 8 August 2015 in a game against Gil Vicente.

References

1986 births
Living people
Brazilian footballers
S.C. Farense players
Louletano D.C. players
C.D. Mafra players
Liga Portugal 2 players
S.R. Almancilense players
Association football midfielders